Luminiţa is a Romanian feminine given name that may refer to
 Luminița Anghel, Romanian singer
 Luminița Dinu (born 1971), Romanian handball player
 Luminița Dobrescu (born 1971), Romanian swimmer
 Luminița Gheorghiu (1949–2021), Romanian actress
 Luminița Pișcoran (born 1988), Romanian biathlete
 Luminița Talpoș (born 1972), Romanian long-distance runner
 Luminița Trombițaș (born 1971), Romanian volleyball player
 Luminița Vese, Romanian image processing researcher
 Luminita Zaituc (born 1968), German long-distance runner

See also
 Elena-Luminița Cosma (born 1972), Romanian chess player
 Sorina-Luminița Plăcintă (born 1965), Romanian engineer and politician

Romanian feminine given names